The badminton men's team tournament at the 2021 Southeast Asian Games was held from 16 to 18 May 2022 at the Bac Giang Gymnasium, Bắc Giang, Vietnam.

Schedule
All times are Vietnam Standard Time (UTC+07:00)

Bracket

Quarter-finals

Indonesia vs Cambodia

Thailand vs Philippines

Laos vs Singapore

Vietnam vs Malaysia

Semi-finals

Indonesia vs Thailand

Singapore vs Malaysia

Finals

Thailand vs Malaysia

See also
Individual event
Women's team tournament

References

Men's team